Tommaso Gattoni (born 19 August 1993) is an Italian professional footballer who plays as a midfielder for  club Pro Sesto.

Club career
Gattoni started his career in Serie D clubs, and made his Serie C and professional debut for Real Agro Aversa in 2014.

On 14 July 2019, he joined Serie C club Pro Sesto.

References

External links
 
 

1993 births
Living people
Footballers from Venice
Italian footballers
Association football midfielders
Serie C players
Serie D players
S.S.D. Calcio San Donà players
A.S. Pro Piacenza 1919 players
S.C. Caronnese S.S.D. players
S.S.D. Pro Sesto players